Nadowli-Kaleo District is one of the eleven districts in Upper West Region, Ghana. Originally it was formerly part of the then-larger Nadowli District in 1988; until the eastern part of the district were later split off to create Daffiama-Bussie-Issa District on 28 June 2012; thus the remaining part has been renamed as Nadowli-Kaleo District. The district assembly is located in the northeast part of Upper West Region and has Nadowli as its capital town.

Economy
Agriculture is the most important economic sector of Nadowli District, accounting for about 85% of the labor force. The commercial and industrial sectors are less developed.

References 

Districts of Upper West Region